Calvin Thomas is an American academic who works in the fields of critical theory, modern and postmodern literature and culture.  He is a professor at Georgia State University. His writings have focused on gender, sexuality and the body, with an especial interest in "straight" responses to queer theory.

Publications

Thomas, Calvin (2013). Ten Lessons in Theory: An Introduction to Theoretical Writing. London: Bloomsbury Academic.

External links
Calvin Thomas web page at Georgia State University

Year of birth missing (living people)
Living people
Georgia State University faculty
Gender studies academics
Queer theorists